Conservator (female Conservatrix) may refer to:
 Conservator of a Conservatorship, in the United States, a person appointed by a court or regulatory authority to supervise a person or entity's financial affairs
 Conservator (religion), a judge appointed by the Pope to protect the personae miserabiles
 Conservator-restorer, a professional who protects and cares for museum collections and other objects of cultural heritage
 Conservators who manage areas of countryside in England
 Conservator who keeps the public records in Portugal
 In electrical engineering, part of an oil-filled transformer where oil is stored
 The Conservator, a late 19th Century Chicago radical journal (see Ferdinand Lee Barnett)